Battle of Ushant may refer to:
Action of 10 August 1780, a minor naval engagement that took place during the American Revolutionary War between a Royal Navy frigate and a French Navy frigate. This was the first engagement thought to involve the use of the carronade.
Battle of Ushant (1781), a convoy battle, also during the American War of Independence
Battle of Ushant (1782), called the "Third Battle of Ushant" or the "Action of 20–21 April 1782", the third battle that occurred in this region during the course of the war.
Battle of Ushant (1944), a battle among the British, Canadian and Polish destroyers of the 10th Flotilla and the German destroyers of the 8th Narvik Flotilla, won by the Allies